The Transnational Association of Christian Colleges and Schools (TRACS) is a U.S. based institutional accreditation organization that focuses on Christian colleges, universities, and seminaries seeking collegiate accreditation in the United States. TRACS, which is based in Forest, Virginia, is recognized by the United States Department of Education and the Council for Higher Education Accreditation.

TRACS is a significant accreditor of historically black colleges and universities, especially those that have lost their regional accreditation for failing to meet fiscal sustainability obligations.  Despite the transnational in its name, almost all of the schools the organization reviews are located in the United States. TRACS is also notable for requiring creationism and creationist science as part of its accredited curriculums.

History
The organization was founded in 1979. According to the Institute for Creation Research (ICR), TRACS is a "product of the ICR". TRACS required, through at least 2018, all accredited schools to have a statement of faith that affirms "the inerrancy and historicity of the Bible" and "the divine work of non-evolutionary creation including persons in God's image".

TRACS's first application for federal recognition in 1987 was denied, but in 1991 under President George H. W. Bush, U.S. Education Secretary Lamar Alexander "approved TRACS, despite his advisory panel's repeatedly recommending against recognition." Approval came following TRACS' third rejection by the board in which Secretary Alexander "arranged for an appeal hearing," and critics of the approval said the move was about politics. TRACS' approval "worried" accrediting officials who concluded that TRACS was not a qualified accreditor and the move was criticized by education officials.

Another source of criticism was the 1991 granting of accreditation to the Institute for Creation Research. One of TRACS' board members was Henry M. Morris, founder of ICR. Attorney Timothy Sandefur called Morris's position on the board "highly questionable".  In 2007 John D. Morris, Henry Morris' son, asked TRACS to terminate the ICR's accreditation. The reason was, in part, that the ICR moved to Texas and the state did not recognize TRACS at that time.

In 1993, Steve Levicoff published a book-length critical discussion of TRACS, When the TRACS Stop Short: An Evaluation and Critique of the Transnational Association of Christian Colleges and Schools. Levicoff criticized TRACS's expedited accreditation of Liberty University and its creation of a category for schools which it called associate schools. While this category "was not considered an official accreditation," Levicoff argued that TRACS lent its name to a number of "blatantly fraudulent institutions." Liberty gained TRACS accreditation in September 1984, but resigned its accreditation on November 6, 2008.

In 1995, a federal review was conducted and National Advisory Committee on Institutional Quality and Integrity placed TRACS on 18 months probation. Critics argued that TRACS should have never had approval and the reason for the initial rejections "wasn't over doctrine, but whether they were in the process of accrediting schools which truly gave degrees in line with other similar degrees." One reason for the probation was TRACS starting the  accrediting process for schools that could not meet basic requirements, such as Nashville Bible College, which was granted "accreditation candidate status" when it had twelve full-time students, seven part-time students, and two part-time faculty members. Improvements were made, including eliminating the "associate schools" category and changing chairmen.

TRACS has authority for the "accreditation and preaccreditation ("Candidate" status) of postsecondary institutions in the United States that offer certificates, diplomas, and associate, baccalaureate, and graduate degrees, including institutions that offer distance education." Its most recent scheduled review for recognition was in 2020. TRACS was granted reauthorization after their latest appearance before NACIQI in October 2021.  TRACS received this recognition from the same committee that revoked the largest accreditor’s recognition, and placed stipulations on the ABAs accreditation procedures.

See also
 List of recognized accreditation associations of higher learning
 Higher education accreditation in the United States

References

External links
Transnational Association of Christian Colleges, official site

 
1979 establishments in Virginia